Jimmy Steele (8 August 1907 – 9 August 1970) was born in Belfast, Ireland and was one of the most prominent Irish Republican Army (IRA) men in Belfast after the Irish Civil War. Steele was an Irish republican who spent most of his life in jail as a result of his activities with the IRA.

Steele joined Fianna Éireann in 1920 during the Irish War of Independence and later went on to join the IRA. He was arrested in 1923 and again in 1924 and imprisoned in Crumlin Road Gaol. After his release in 1925, Steele helped in the re-organisation of the IRA's Belfast Brigade.

In the summer of 1935 Steele led IRA units in the defense of Catholic homes during the Lancaster Street riots (see The Troubles in Northern Ireland (1920–1922)). Also in 1935, Steele led an IRA raid on a RUC base within the grounds of Campbell College, a school in the east of the city. The raid was unsuccessful due to a tip-off, and Steele managed to escape. The following year he was arrested for the raid along with several other IRA members and again sent to Crumlin Road Gaol on a five year sentence. While in jail, Steele was one of eight Irish Republican prisoners conducting a hunger strike demanding political status. In 1943 Steele, along with Patrick Donnelly, Ned Maguire and Hugh McAteer escaped from the Gaol. Shortly afterwards he was appointed adjutant of the Northern Command. While on the run he helped 21 prisoners escape from jail on 20 March 1943, this was known as The Big Derry Jail Escape.

In late 1943 Steele was sentenced to 12 years in jail and was subjected to 12 "strokes of the birch". Steele had been arrested on charges related to the IRAs bombing/sabotage campaign in England - the S-Plan) and the Border Campaign. In October, 1950 Steele was the last S-Plan internee released. While interned in Belfast jail Steele and other Irish republican prisoners tried to secure treatment as political prisoner. When their requests were denied 22 prisoners went on a "strip strike" in which they removed their clothes. Prison authorities responded by removing everything from the prisoners cells except the frame of the bed, a sanitary vessel and a carafe of water for the whole day. (Mattress and blanket were returned at the end of the day.) The strike was called off after about three months. Steele was also arrested/imprisoned in 1967. He wrote for a number of republican publications, including Glor Uladh, Resurgent Ulster and An Phoblacht. In the 1950 United Kingdom general election Steele stood for Sinn Féin in the West Belfast constituency.

Steele was founder of the Belfast Republican Press Centre in 1970. He was the first editor of Republican News, which started as a monthly and later became a weekly.

He died on 9 August 1970 the year after the IRA split between the Official IRA and the Provisional IRA, in which he sided with the Provisionals. He was one of the leaders of the 1969 split, being critical of the leadership of the time. Steele was critical of the republican movements turn to the left: "One is now expected to be more conversant with the thoughts of Chairman Mao than those of our dead patriots."

References

1907 births
1970 deaths
Irish Republican Army (1922–1969) members
Irish republicans
Provisional Irish Republican Army members
Republicans imprisoned during the Northern Ireland conflict
Sinn Féin parliamentary candidates